Tathiana Garbin and Janette Husárová were the defending champions but none competed this year, as both players decided to play in Dubai at the same week.

Virginia Ruano Pascual and Paola Suárez won the title by defeating Tina Križan and Katarina Srebotnik 6–2, 6–1 in the final.

Seeds

Draw

Draw

Qualifying

Seeds

Qualifiers
  Maria Elena Camerin /  Giulia Casoni

Lucky losers
  Julia Schruff /  Scarlett Werner

Qualifying draw

References
 Official results archive (ITF)
 Official results archive (WTA)

Copa Colsanitas - Doubles
2002 Doubles